It Should've Been Me is the debut album of Zoot Money's Big Roll Band, released in 1965. The album's liner notes were by Alexis Korner.

Track listing
Side 1
"I'll Go Crazy" (James Brown)
"Jump Back" (Rufus Thomas)
"Along Came John" (John Patton)
"Back Door Blues" (Robert Brown)
"It Should've Been Me" (Memphis Curtis)
"Sweet Little Rock and Roller" (Chuck Berry)
Side 2
"My Wife Can't Cook" (Gerald L. Russ)
"Rags and Old Iron" (Norman Curtis, Oscar Brown Jr.)
"The Cat" (Lalo Schifrin)
"Feelin' Sad" (Eddie "Guitar Slim" Jones)
"Bright Lights, Big City" (Jimmy Reed)
"Fina" (Stuart)

Personnel
Zoot Money - vocals, organ
Paul Williams bass - vocals on "Jump Back" and "Rags and Old Iron"
Andy Summers - guitar
Colin Allen - drums
  Nick Newall - tenor saxophone
 Clive Burroughs - baritone saxophone

References

1965 debut albums
Columbia Records albums